Pliciloricidae are a family of marine organisms in the phylum Loricifera. It contains 23 species in 4 genera.

Genera 
 Pliciloricus 
 Rugiloricus 
 Titaniloricus 
 Wataloricus

References

External links 

Loricifera